Carambie Cave is a large, relatively dry, white limestone cave in Trelawny Parish, Jamaica. It is believed that it may have been used by Taíno people although no evidence of their presence has been found. It does contain historical graffiti dating back to 1821.

Natural history
Carambie cave is home to a small roost of fruit bats as well a few other bat species. There are several species of invertebrates, mostly living on the limited bat guano deposits. These include some flies (mainly Neoditomyia farri) and some spiders.

The cave has three entrances: Light , Dark  and Back .

Fossils
A specimen of the foraminiferan Dictyoconus jontabellensis Vaughan was found in the roof of one of the entrances during the 1950s.

See also
List of caves in Jamaica
Jamaican Caves Organisation

References

External links
 
 

Caves of Jamaica
Geography of Trelawny Parish
Caves of the Caribbean